Blerim Kotobelli (born 10 August 1992) is an Albanian professional footballer who plays as a left-back for Teuta.

Club career

Teuta Durrës
In June 2014, Kotobelli completed a transfer to Teuta Durrës by penning a one-year contract. He debuted with the team on 23 August 2014 in the opening league match of 2014–15 season against Flamurtari Vlorë. Following this, Kotobelli become a regular starter in the lineup, playing 35 matches throughout the campaign, including 32 in league, as Teuta barely avoided relegation. He also scored two goals in the defeats against Apolonia Fier and Skënderbeu Korçë.

Kotobelli was distinguished for his performances in the first part of 2015–16 season, as Teuta become a contender for a European spot next season. He was able to make 34 league appearances, all of them as starter, as Teuta gained the right to play in Europa League first qualifying round by finishing fourth, tied with Kukësi.

He kicked off 2016–17 season on 30 June by making his European debut in the match against Kairat, playing full-90 minutes in a 0–1 home defeat. He also played in the returning leg of week later, as Teuta were smashed 5–0, its second biggest defeat of all time, eliminated from the competition with the aggregate 6–0. On 27 May of the following year, in the final matchday, Kotobelli made his 100th league appearance for Teuta by starting in a 2–1 away defeat at Laçi.

Only four days later, it was confirmed that Kotobelli left the club after three seasons, where he collected 114 appearances in all competitions, scoring three times, being one of the most valued players of the team.

Partizani Tirana
On 9 June 2017, Kotobelli joined fellow Albanian Superliga side Partizani Tirana by signing a one-year contract with an option of a further one. He was presented by Luciano Moggi and was handed squad number 15. He played his first match for his new club on 10 September by starting in a 2–0 home loss to Laçi. The 2017–18 season was below expectation for Kotobelli, as he struggled to keep his spot in the starting lineup, making 31 appearances in all competitions, including 25 in league, collecting 1658 minutes. On 16 June 2018, Partizani Tirana announced via its official website the departure of Kotobelli after one year.

Return to Teuta
After 4 years of leaving the club with spells at Partizani Tirana, Flamurtari Vlorë, and Kukësi, on 26 June 2021, Kotobelli returned to Teuta Durrës signing to a 2-year contract.

International career
In November 2013, Kotobelli received his first call-up to the under-21 squad for the 2015 UEFA European Under-21 Championship qualifying matches against Hungary and Spain. He made his debut on 14 November by playing full-90 minutes in Albania's 2–0 away win at Hungary. He also played full-90 minutes in the next match against Spain, as Albania slumped into a 0–2 home defeat.

Career statistics

References

External links
FSHF profile

1992 births
Living people
People from Skrapar
Albanian footballers
Albania under-21 international footballers
Association football fullbacks
KF Tirana players
KF Teuta Durrës players
FK Partizani Tirana players
Flamurtari Vlorë players
FK Kukësi players
Kategoria e Dytë players
Kategoria Superiore players